Elymus wiegandii, or Wiegand's wildrye, is a plant indigenous to North America.

References

External links

wiegandii
Flora of North America